Ƴ (minuscule: ƴ) is a letter of the Latin alphabet, formed from Y with the addition of a hook. It is used in some African languages, such as Fula and Hausa, to represent a palatalized glottal stop, .

The placement of the hook on the capital Ƴ

The original Unicode charts showed the hook on the left, while most use in Africa had it on the right, as reflected in the 1978 African reference alphabet. The Unicode usage apparently followed that shown in ISO 6438, but it is not clear where the latter got it. The form used in the code charts was later changed to show the hook on the right side.

Alternative representations

An alternative representation of the sound is y. This is used in the orthographies of Hausa and Fula in Nigeria, while ƴ is used in Niger for Hausa, and in most of West Africa for Fula. See also: Pan-Nigerian alphabet

In the orthography for languages of Guinea (pre-1985), yh was used instead of ƴ.

See also

Alphabets with this letter
African reference alphabet
Alphabets for the following specific languages:
Fula (see also Fula orthographies)
Hausa (only in Niger, not in Nigeria)

Notes

References
"African Reference Alphabet" (Niamey 1978)
"Latin Extended B: Range 0180-024F" (Unicode code chart)
"Variants for Hooktop Y (U+01B3 and U+01B4)" (SIL, NRSI)

Y